
Lac d'Enghien is a freshwater lake in France.

Geography
Lac d'Enghien is in the Île-de-France region, approximately seven miles north of Paris. Administratively it belongs to the commune of Enghien-les-Bains in the department of Val-d'Oise. It is the department's largest body of water.

Features

See also
Montmorency, Val-d'Oise

References 

Enghien
Landforms of Val-d'Oise